Adonyev, also transliterated as Adoniev, is a Russian surname. Notable people with the surname include:

Serguei Adoniev (born 1961), Russian businessman and philanthropist

Russian-language surnames